A spiral is a curve which emanates from a central point, getting progressively farther away as it revolves around the point.

Spiral may also refer to:

Science, mathematics and art
 Spiral galaxy, a type of galaxy in astronomy
 Spiral Dynamics, a theory of human development
 Spiral cleavage, a type of cleavage in embryonic development
 Victoria and Albert Museum Spiral, a proposed (abandoned in 2004) controversial extension to the museum
 Spiral (arts alliance), an African-American art collective
 Spiral (publisher), a New Zealand women's publisher and art collective
 Spiral model, a software development process

Transport
 Spiral (railway), a technique employed by railways to ascend steep hills
 9K114 Shturm, an anti-tank missile that is known under the NATO reporting name as AT-6 Spiral
 Mikoyan-Gurevich MiG-105 Spiral, a Soviet spaceplane
 Spiral dive, a type of generally undesirable and accidental descent manoeuvre in an aircraft

Film and television
 Spiral (1978 film), a Polish film
 Spiral (1998 film), a Japanese film
 Uzumaki (film), or Spiral, a 2000 Japanese film
 Spiral (2007 film), an American film
 Spiral (2014 film), a Russian film
 Spiral (2019 film), a Canadian film
 Spiral (2021 film), an American film, part of the Saw horror franchise
 Spiral (TV series), English title of French thriller series Engrenages
 Spiral: The Bonds of Reasoning, a 2002 Japanese anime series
 "Spiral" (Buffy the Vampire Slayer), a 2001 TV series episode
 "Spiral", 2010 television series episode of Haven (season 1)
 "Spiral", 2015 episode of NCIS: Los Angeles (season 6)
 Glen Coroner, a.k.a. Spiral, 2006 contestant in the UK Big Brother TV show
 Spiral, a character from the television series Pac-Man and the Ghostly Adventures

Books and comics
 Spiral (Suzuki novel), a 1995 Japanese book in the Ring series
 Spiral (comics), comic book character
 Spiral: The Bonds of Reasoning, a 2002 mystery anime and manga series
 Spiral (Tunnels novel), 2011/12 novel by Roderick Gordon
  Spiralis/Spiril, the Bokmål/Danish name for the Marsupilami
 Uzumaki, a 1998 horror manga series

Music
Spiraling (band)

Albums
 Spiral (Allison Crowe album), 2010
 Spiral (Andrew Hill album), 1975
 Spiral (Bobby Hutcherson album), 1979
Spiral (Darkside album), 2021
 Spiral (Hiromi album), 2006
 Spiral (Kenny Barron album), 1982
 Spiral (Rezz album), 2021
 Spiral (Vangelis album), 1977
 Spirals (album), by Blood Has Been Shed, 2003

Songs and pieces
 Spiral (Norman), a 2018 orchestral composition by Andrew Norman
 Spiral (Stockhausen), a 1968 process-music composition by Karlheinz Stockhausen
 "Spiral" (Arne Bendiksen song), the Norwegian Eurovision Song Contest 1964 entry by Arne Joachim Bendiksen
 "Spiral" (Paul McCartney song), from Working Classical, 1999
 "Spiral" (Pendulum song), a 2003 song by Australian drum and bass group Pendulum
 "Spiralling" (song), a 2008 song by Keane
 Spiral, track four from John Coltrane's Giant Steps
 "Spiral", track five from William Orbit's Hello Waveforms
 "Spiral", a song by Godsmack from Awake
 "Spiral", a single by 21 Savage for the 2021 movie Spiral
 The Spiral, the official fan organization of Nine Inch Nails

Other
 Spiral (bobsleigh, luge, and skeleton), a track near Nagano City, Japan used for the 1998 Winter Olympics
 Spiral approach, a teaching technique
 Spiral dance, a neo-pagan dance
 Figure skating spirals, an element in figure skating
 Spiral staircase, a type of stairway characterized by its spiral shape
 SPIRAL: Selected Patient Information in Asian Languages
 Spiral (batteries), a construnction type of cylindrical batteries
 Spiral (dinghy), a type or class of sailing dinghy
 Spiral (piercing), a thick spiral that is usually worn through the ear lobe
 Spiral (building) in Tokyo
 The Spiral (New York City), a New York City skyscraper designed by Bjarke Ingels Group
 Spiral (football)

See also
 Helix (disambiguation)